The 2015 Wokingham Borough Council election took place on 7 May 2015 to elect members of Wokingham Borough Council in England. This was on the same day as other local elections.

Election result
The Conservatives retained control of the council and gained two seats from the Liberal Democrats, winning all seats that were up for election.

Ward results

8 Ballot papers were rejected

39 ballot papers were rejected

18 ballot papers were rejected

31 ballot papers were rejected

23 ballot papers were rejected

 

21 ballot papers were rejected

23 ballot papers were rejected

31 ballot papers were rejected

27 ballot papers were rejected

42 ballot papers were rejected

6 ballot papers were rejected

11 ballot papers were rejected

6 ballot papers were rejected

12 ballot papers were rejected

7 ballot papers were rejected

19 ballot papers were rejected

11 ballot papers were rejected

17 ballot papers were rejected

References

2015 English local elections
May 2015 events in the United Kingdom
2015
2010s in Berkshire